Ahmadreza Rofougaran, also known as Reza Rofougaran is an Iranian-American Electrical engineer, inventor and entrepreneur.

Early life and education 
Rofougaran was born in Isfahan, Iran, and moved to the US in the 1980s after the closure of Iranian universities after the 1979 Iranian Revolution to study electrical engineering at the University of California, Los Angeles. Rofougaran obtained his BS in 1986, MS in 1988 and earned his PhD from the University of California, Los Angeles in 1998. His PhD thesis was focused on the development of a fast frequency hopped spectrum wireless system using CMOS integrated circuits and was supported by DARPA and focused on the development of other wireless systems such as GPS using CMOS technology which was supported by DARPA SBIR program.

Career 
Rofougaran is best known for pioneering RF CMOS technology and the integration of the RF radio with digital processors to enable short-range wireless connectivity, Bluetooth, and short-range wireless network, Wi-Fi, and millimeter RF.

He is a Fellow of the Institute of Electrical and Electronics Engineers (IEEE) since 2010 for contributions to the integration of RF radios into single-chip CMOS technology, member of the National Academy of Engineering. Rofougaran holds 869 issued U.S. patents and listed as a prolific inventor.

Innovent Systems Inc 
In 1998, he co-founded Innovent Systems Inc, a company based in El Segundo, California, and specializing in the development and research in RF CMOS, RF radio, and digital processing to enable short-range wireless connectivity, in 2000, Broadcom Corporation acquired Innovent Systems for $440 million. In 2005, while working at Broadcom Corporation, Rofougaran managed to integrate multiple wireless systems into single-chip CMOS, which enabled smartphones with Wi-Fi in coexistence with Bluetooth and other wireless systems. He is a Fellow of Broadcom since 2006 for contributions to RF CMOS and radio technology that was crucial to building Broadcom's wireless business.

Movandi 
In 2016, Rofougaran co-founded Movandi, an Irvine, California-based company specializing in developing 5G wireless network systems.

Awards and recognitions 

 2020 OCBJ Innovator of the Year Award.
2020 Ellis Island Medal of Honor.
2020 National Academy of Engineering Membership.
 2018 IEEE Industrial Pioneer Award. 
 2018 Alumnus of the year, Henry Samueli School of Engineering, UCLA.
 2017 The Top 5 Technology Innovators, Electronic Products Magazine.
2014 IEEE Journal of Solid-State Circuits Best Paper Award.
2010 IEEE Fellow.
2006 Broadcom Fellow.

References 

Living people
Year of birth missing (living people)
20th-century American engineers
American electronics engineers
University of California, Los Angeles alumni
Fellow Members of the IEEE
Members of the United States National Academy of Engineering
Iranian expatriate academics
20th-century American inventors